Žihárec is a village and municipality in Šaľa District, in the Nitra Region of south-west Slovakia.

Geography

History
In historical records, the village was first mentioned in 1251. After the Austro-Hungarian army disintegrated in November 1918, Czechoslovak troops liberated the area, also later acknowledged internationally by the Treaty of Trianon. Between 1938 and 1945, Žihárec became occupied by Miklós Horthy's Hungary through the First Vienna Award. From 1945, until the Velvet Divorce, it was part of Czechoslovakia. Since then it has been part of Slovakia.

Population
According to the 2011 census, the municipality had 1,638 inhabitants. 1,079 of them were Hungarians, 512 Slovaks and 47 others were unspecified.

References

Facilities
The village has a public library and a football pitch.

External links
http://www.statistics.sk/mosmis/eng/run.html

Villages and municipalities in Šaľa District
Hungarian communities in Slovakia